Gaetan Augsburger (born 4 April 1988) is a Swiss ice hockey player. He is currently playing with Lausanne HC of the Swiss National League A.

Augsburger made his National League A debut playing with Genève-Servette HC during the 2005–06 NLA season.

References

External links

1988 births
Living people
Genève-Servette HC players
Lausanne HC players
Swiss ice hockey forwards
Swiss sportsmen